RC Přelouč is a Czech rugby club based in Přelouč. They currently play in the KB První Liga.

History
The club was founded on 16 June 1974 by Leopold Blachut, Jiří Mít and Jiří Franta out of the former Dukla Přelouč military team. They played their first match on 14 September 1974 against Slavia Prague B in Prague, eventually losing 35-41 after trailing 9-11 at half-time.

In 1987 the club undertook its first overseas tour, to France.

They qualified for the first ever KB extraliga back in 1993, after beating Bystrc, (then known as Lokomotiva-Ingstav Brno), and Olomouc in qualifying matches.

In 1998 the club withdrew from the 1998/99 season after three rounds due to lack of players and financial difficulties.

Historical names
 TJ Tesla Přelouč (1974–1990)
 RC Přelouč (1990-)

External links
RC Přelouč
80 let Českého Ragby (80 years of Czech Rugby)

Czech rugby union teams
Rugby clubs established in 1974
Pardubice District